Three Quartets is a jazz album released in 1981 by American jazz pianist Chick Corea, in collaboration with saxophonist Michael Brecker, bassist Eddie Gómez and drummer Steve Gadd.  All compositions are by Corea who wanted to create an album of quartets like the many string quartets of the Baroque, Classical, Romantic and Impressionist periods, but with jazz instrumentation.

"Quartet No. 1" uses a 1-chord (G altered) solo vamp over a rock beat in 3/4, and a repeated theme that uses stacked fourths.
The second track, "Quartet No. 2 (Part I)" is a ballad, dedicated to jazz pioneer Duke Ellington, incorporating many of the Western classical harmonies and tensions that Ellington used in much of his playing.  "Quartet No. 2 (Part II)" is dedicated to jazz saxophone legend John Coltrane.

Track listing 
All compositions by Chick Corea except as noted.

"Quartet No. 1" – (10:16)
"Quartet No. 3" – (9:41)
"Quartet No. 2" - Part I (Dedicated to Duke Ellington)" – (7:09)
"Quartet No. 2" - Part II (Dedicated to John Coltrane)" – (12:01)

The CD reissue contains several tracks that were recorded during the same sessions as the original album but not released at the time. These are:

"Folk Song" – (5:51)
"Hairy Canary" – (3:43)
"Slippery When Wet" – (6:02)
"Confirmation" (Charlie Parker) – (6:17)

Corea plays drums on "Confirmation" instead of Steve Gadd.

Personnel 
Musicians
 Chick Corea – piano; drums (track 8)
 Michael Brecker – tenor saxophone
 Eddie Gómez – double bass
 Steve Gadd – drums (tracks 1-7)

Production
 Bernie Kirsh – recording and mixing engineer 
 Duncan Aldrich – assistant engineer
 Joel Strote – associate executive producer
 Adam Zelinka – post producer
 Stephen Marcussen – remastering
 Sonny Mediana – graphic design
 Andy Baltimore – creative director
 Dan Serrano – graphic design
 Andy Ruggirello – graphic design
 Darryl Pitt – photography
 Susan Garson – project coordinator
 Richard Veloso – art producer

Chart performance

References

External links 
 Chick Corea - Three Quartets (1981) album review by Scott Yanow, credits & releases at AllMusic
 Chick Corea - Three Quartets (1981) album releases & credits at Discogs
 Chick Corea - Three Quartets (1981, Remastered 1992 with Bonus Tracks) album to be listened as stream on Spotify

1981 albums
Chick Corea albums
Stretch Records albums